Luke Bell (born 1994) is a filmmaker, drone pilot and videographer from Cape Town, South Africa.

Life and career 
Luke studied Mechatronic Engineering at the University of Cape Town where he began his career.

In 2017 Luke was among the winners of the annual Dronestagram drone photography competition. In 2020 he was awarded first place in the music video category in the Moment Invitational Film Festival presented in New York City.

In 2020 Luke became a Sony α ambassador for Middle East and Africa.

During the COVID-19 pandemic, Luke received clearance to film the empty streets of Cape Town by drone. In more recent years he has worked as a drone pilot and drone camera operator on films like Resident Evil (TV series) and The Year Earth Changed.

Filmography

Awards and nominations

References

External links 
 
 Interview with Drone Pilot Luke Bell | 26 July 2017, Expresso Show

1994 births
Living people
South African cinematographers
University of Cape Town alumni